Harri Jõgisalu (until 1936 Harri Konstabel; 24 August 1922, in Korju, Paadrema Parish, Lääne County – 18 September 2014) was an Estonian children's writer. He wrote mainly about nature and traditional rural life.

During World War II, he fought in the German army. From 1944 to 1946, he was a prisoner of war at Parakhino in Russia. In 1950, he graduated from Tallinn Teachers' Institute and in 1955 from the Leningrad Pedagogical Institute as a teacher of chemistry and biology. From 1947 to 1978, he taught at Märjamaa Secondary School.

Selected works
 1967: short story "Käopoja tänu" ('The Cuckoo-chick's Thanks')
 1982: short story "Kärp" ('The Stoat')
 1984: short story "Maaleib" ('Bread of the Land')

References

1922 births
2014 deaths
Estonian male short story writers
Estonian children's writers
20th-century Estonian writers
People from Lääneranna Parish
German Army personnel of World War II